Lone Cone is a prominent mountain summit at the western end of the San Miguel Mountains range of the Rocky Mountains of North America.

Geology
The mountain, a laccolith, is between 20 and 40 million years old and is the westernmost of over a dozen laccoliths that are the same age as rocks in the San Juan volcanic field.

Historical names
Lone Cone – 1906 
West Point

See also

List of Colorado mountain ranges
List of Colorado mountain summits
List of Colorado fourteeners
List of Colorado 4000 meter prominent summits
List of the most prominent summits of Colorado
List of Colorado county high points

References

External links

Mountains of Colorado
Mountains of Dolores County, Colorado
Mountains of San Miguel County, Colorado
San Juan National Forest
Uncompahgre National Forest
North American 3000 m summits
Laccoliths